KPNC (100.7 FM) is a radio station broadcasting a Country music format. Licensed to Ponca City, Oklahoma, United States, the station is currently owned by Team Radio, L.L.C.

References

External links
 Official Website
 KPNC profile at Team Radio's corporate website
 

Country radio stations in the United States
PNC